The Southwest Florida Manatees were an American soccer team that played in Cape Coral, Florida.

In the 1997 season they played in the United States Interregional Soccer League Premier Development Soccer League. In the 1998 season, they played in the USISL D-3 Pro League. In 1998, the Southwest Florida Manatees were an affiliate for the Tampa Bay Mutiny of Major League Soccer. The team folded after the 1998 USISL D-3 Pro League season.

Year-by-year

Source: RSSSF

References 

Defunct soccer clubs in Florida
USISL teams
Cape Coral, Florida
1997 establishments in Florida
Association football clubs established in 1997
1998 disestablishments in Florida
Soccer clubs in Florida
Association football clubs disestablished in 1998